Balch Cave is a cave in Fairy Cave Quarry, near Stoke St Michael in the limestone of the Mendip Hills, in Somerset, England. The cave is part of the complex of passages feeding to  St. Dunstan's Well Catchment Site of Special Scientific Interest and an abandoned Bristol Water abstraction point.

It is named in honour of Herbert E. Balch who was famous for his exploration of the Caves of the Mendip Hills.

The cave was broken into by quarry blasting in November 1961. Much of the cave has since been quarried away and by the end of the 1960s, major sections were destroyed.

A further visit in January 1962 explored the fourth chamber which is richly ornamented with white and cream flowstone, several narrow curtains, and miscellaneous white stalactites, and the fifth and sixth chambers with multiple Stalagmite formations.

Stabilisation work at the end of the quarry's life resulted in the destruction of a further  of passage, including the original entrance series and Great Chamber.

The Fairy Caves Management Committee administers the access to this cave on behalf of the quarry owners. The cave is closed from 1 October to 30 April to protect the hibernating bats.

References

See also 
 Caves of the Mendip Hills

Caves of the Mendip Hills
Limestone caves